Douglass High School was built in  1941 in what was then a rural area just outside Leesburg, Virginia as the first high school for African-American students in Loudoun County. The school was built on land purchased by the black community for $4,000 and conveyed to the county for $1. It was the only high school for African-American students until the end of segregation in Loudoun County in 1968.

Description
The plan is centered on a commons area that functioned as a gymnasium, cafeteria and auditorium, flanked by two classrooms on either side. Large windows light and ventilate the spaces. A large stage area is directly opposite the main entrance, which opens directly into the commons area from a vestibule. Classrooms were added on the rear of the building, followed by a gymnasium in 1960. A vocational wing lies to the west.

History
Until 1941, the only secondary educational facility available to African-American students in Loudoun County was the upper level of the Loudoun County Training School. The frame structure offered a limited curriculum in an unsafe building. During the late 1930s the black community in Loudoun County organized fundraiser events to purchase  of land on the east side of Leesburg from W.S. Gibbons.  The property was conveyed to Loudoun County for $1 on December 16, 1940. After threats of legal action, the school board approved a measure to borrow $30,000 from the State Literary Fund of Virginia to build the school. A bid from the Taylor Manufacturing Company of Farmville, Virginia was approved for $35,438. The school opened in September 1941. The school was named for African-American abolitionist Frederick Douglass at the request of the community organizers. Since a bare minimum of furnishings were provided by the county, more private donations were sought to more fully furnish the school. With desegregation in 1968 the building became a middle school, then a special education and alternative school.

Douglass High School was placed on the National Register of Historic Places on September 24, 1992.

References

External links
Douglas School Official Website

Defunct schools in Virginia
National Register of Historic Places in Loudoun County, Virginia
Schools in Loudoun County, Virginia
School buildings on the National Register of Historic Places in Virginia
Historically segregated African-American schools in Virginia
Leesburg, Virginia
School buildings completed in 1941